"Home" is a single by German DJ Topic featuring German singer-songwriter Nico Santos. The song was a hit in Australia, Germany, and Austria.

Charts

Weekly charts

Year-end charts

Certifications

References

2015 songs
2015 singles
Topic (DJ) songs
Songs written by Topic (DJ)